Hayk Musakhanyan (born 20 March 1998) is a professional footballer who plays for Noah.

Career
Born in Minsk to Armenian parents, Musakhanyan moved with his family to France at the age of 6. After spending a few seasons at the youth squad of French side SR Colmar, he returned to Belarus in 2017.

On 24 January 2022, Noah announced the signing of Musakhanyan.

References

External links 
 
 

1998 births
Living people
Footballers from Minsk
French footballers
Armenian footballers
French expatriate footballers
Armenian expatriate footballers
Expatriate footballers in Belarus
Association football forwards
SR Colmar players
FC Energetik-BGU Minsk players
FC Noah players